Matthew F. Coppolino (October 16, 1929 – June 7, 2000) was a Republican member of the Pennsylvania House of Representatives.

References

Republican Party members of the Pennsylvania House of Representatives
1929 births
2000 deaths
20th-century American politicians